Christina Sandberg (born 11 January 1948) is a former professional Swedish tennis player. She reached the quarter finals of the 1970 Australian Open in both the singles and doubles. She played for Sweden in the Federation Cup in 25 matches, and is famous for beating Virginia Wade in the first round of the 1968 Wimbledon Championships - Women's Singles.

Federation Cup

Sandberg first played for Sweden in the Federation Cup, which was later renamed Fed Cup, on 10 May 1966 in Turin against Italy, beating Jacqueline Morales 7–9, 6–3, 6–2. She played her last Federation Cup match in May 1974 against Poland in Naples, losing to Barbara Kral 6–1, 6–1.

All together, she played 16 singles, winning 9, and 9 doubles, winning 5.

Swedish Open
Sandberg became the first Swedish player to win the Swedish Open twice running when she won it in 1965 and 1966.

References

External links

1948 births
Living people
Swedish female tennis players
People from Borås
Sportspeople from Västra Götaland County